Rampur is a village and community development block in Kaimur district of Bihar, India. As of 2011, it had a population of 575, in 94 households. The total block population was 88,876, in 14,110 households.

Demographics 
As of 2011, the sex ratio of Rampur block was 929 females to every 1000 males. The sex ratio was slightly higher in the 0-6 age group, at 935. Out of the total block population of 88,876, 0-6 year olds numbered 16,113, or about 18%. Members of scheduled castes made up 29.98% of Rampur block residents (the highest proportion in Kaimur district), and members of scheduled tribes made up 1.48%. The block's literacy rate was  68.12% (78.30% in men and 57.10% in women).

Most of the block's workforce was engaged in agriculture in 2011, with 21.34% of workers being cultivators who owned or leased their own land and another 63.62% being agricultural labourers who worked someone else's land for money. Another 3.14% were household industry workers, and the remaining 11.89% were other workers. The block's workers were mostly male, with 20,243 being male and 7,736 being female. A higher proportion of women than men were agricultural labourers and household industry workers, while a higher proportion of men than women were cultivators and other workers.

Villages 
Rampur block contains the following 137 villages:

References 

Villages in Kaimur district